The 1967 Yugoslav First Basketball League season was the 23rd season of the Yugoslav First Basketball League.

Classification 

The winning roster of Zadar:
  Miljenko Valčić
  Đuro Stipčević
  Milan Komazec
  
  Mile Marcelić
  Josip Đerđa
  Krešimir Ćosić
  Ratko Laura
  Petar Anić
  Jure Košta
  Goran Brajković
  Petar Jelić
  Željko Troskot
  Nikola Olujić
  Igor Troskot
  Željko Ortika

Coach:  Đorđo Zdrilić

Qualification in 1967-68 season European competitions 

FIBA European Champions Cup
 Zadar (champions)

FIBA Cup Winner's Cup
 Olimpija (2nd)

References

Yugoslav First Basketball League seasons